Tana Tani ('Push and Pull') is a studio album by musicians State of Bengal and Paban Das Baul, released on 12 April 2004 by Real World Records.

Critical response

Adam Greenberg of John Bush of AllMusic rated Tana Tani 3.5/5 and described it as "...well-performed and crafted, but not necessarily to everyone's taste. Martin Longley of BBC Music said, "Paban's extended technique allows his voice to soar majestically.." Derek of EthnoTechno said, "Tana Tani is seductive, reels you in with delicate claws and rips away fragments of your being. When you recover, you realize it was excess dissolved, and you emerge with clarity, focused, inspired and content."

Track listing

Personnel
 Yann Pittard – acoustic guitar
 Marque Gilmore – drums
 Mimlu Sen – finger cymbals
 Cheick Tidiane Seck – keyboards
 Paban Das Baul – vocals
 State of Bengal – mix engineer, recording engineer

References

External links
 
 
 
 

2004 albums
Bengali-language albums
State of Bengal albums
Paban Das Baul albums
Real World Records albums